Rototuna Wind Farm is a proposed wind farm in the Rototuna Forest in Northland, New Zealand. The concept is being developed by Meridian Energy, and has the potential to produce up to 500 MW.

The wind resource for this project has been monitored since 2006.  Feasibility studies also include radar mapping of the flight paths of birds migrating through the area.  A study commissioned by EECA assessed this wind resource at 200-300 MW.

See also 

List of power stations in New Zealand
Wind power in New Zealand

References

External links 
Meridian Energy website

Proposed wind farms in New Zealand
Kaipara District
Buildings and structures in the Northland Region